Isa Andersen (actual name Isa Jank) is a German actress. She is best known for her role as Clarissa von Anstetten on the soap opera Verbotene Liebe (Forbidden Love). 

Isa started her career in Hollywood in the middle of the 1980s. She played at James Belushi's side in Real Men and other roles in Night Angel, Cheers and Airwolf.

In 1992, she decided to take a turn in her career and accepted a role in the popular legal drama Liebling Kreuzberg. For that she put her career in the United States to rest and returned to Germany.

In 1994, Isa joined the cast of the German soap opera Verbotene Liebe (Forbidden Love). She played the role of Clarissa von Anstetten for almost three years before she was temporarily written out in a successful kidnapping storyline, which went on for almost six months. Isa returned to the show and stayed another two years. In late 1999, Jank started having disagreements about her character but returned as planned after an eight-week break on-screen in February 2000. At this time the trust between Jank and the producers of the show seemed already broken and she left the show permanently in the summer of 2001 in a high-profile exit storyline, where Clarissa got her final battle with archenemy Tanja von Anstetten, played by Miriam Lahnstein. After a plane crash the character was presumed dead but even with Lahnstein's return in 2004, the show refused to confirm to the death of Clarissa.

In October 2005, Isa Jank returned to television taking the role of the antagonist Annabelle Gravenberg in the ZDF telenovela Wege zum Glück. Annabelle showed many similarities to Clarissa and Jank was even asked more often about her old role on Verbotene Liebe. Jank stayed with the telenovela for three years until Annabelle died on-screen in November 2008, shortly before the show ended.

Because Wege zum Glück was produced by Grundy UFA, the same production company responsible for Verbotene Liebe, rumors circled around the web that Jank eventually would return to her old show as Clarissa. The show itself showed lack of quality in storyline at this time and was in need of a character like Clarissa, but Isa Jank debarred the chance of a comeback. It is not known if meetings between the producers of Verbotene Liebe and Jank even took place. However more than two years later, in early 2011, Das Erste announced Isa Jank's return as Clarissa. She first reappeared in June 2011 and was part of a six-months special that was filmed on the Spanish island Mallorca, before joining her colleagues in Cologne. Jank stayed for another year and was then written off the show; with her last appearance on March 20, 2013. Verbotene Liebe was canceled in 2015 without another appearance from Jank.

In 2016, Isa Jank became a housemate in the fourth season of Promi Big Brother.

References

External links

Living people
German film actresses
1952 births
German soap opera actresses